The 1990 Montana Grizzlies football team represented the University of Montana in the 1990 NCAA Division I-AA football season as a member of the Big Sky Conference. The Grizzlies were led by fifth-year head coach Don Read and played their home games on campus in Missoula at Washington–Grizzly Stadium. They finished the season with a 7–4 record, 4–4 in the Big Sky.

Schedule

References

Montana
Montana Grizzlies football seasons
Montana Grizzlies football